Aluminosilicate minerals  (IMA symbol: Als) are minerals composed of aluminium, silicon, and oxygen, plus countercations. They are a major component of kaolin and other clay minerals.

Andalusite, kyanite, and sillimanite are naturally occurring aluminosilicate minerals that have the composition Al2SiO5. These three minerals are commonly used as index minerals in metamorphic rocks.

Naturally occurring microporous, hydrous aluminosilicate minerals are referred to as zeolites.

Feldspar is a common tectosilicate aluminosilicate mineral made of potassium, sodium, and calcium cations surrounded by a negatively charged network of silicon, aluminium and oxygen atoms.

The catalyst silica-alumina is an amorphous substance which is not an aluminosilicate compound.

Aluminosilicate glasses
There exist a wide variety of glass types. The characteristics of these different types depend on the chemical composition of the glass, with a special focus on the oxide composition. Glasses can be categorized into many different groups, one of them including the so-called aluminosilicate glasses.

Properties

Their formulations can also be matched to the thermal expansion coefficients of electrodes, e.g. molybdenum, making possible the creation, via hot-forming processes, of extremely tight gas-proof glass to metal seals.

Alkaline earth aluminosilicate glasses
Characteristically, these glasses are free of alkali oxides and contain 15–25% Al2O3, 52–60% SiO2 and about 15% alkaline earths. Very high transformation temperatures and softening points are typical features. Main fields of application are glass bulbs for halogen lamps, high-temperature thermometers and thermally and electrically highly loadable film resistors.

Alkali aluminosilicate glasses
The Al2O3 content of alkali aluminosilicate glasses is typically 10–25% and the alkali content over 10%. The high alkali content prepares the glass for ion exchange with bigger alkali ions in order to improve the surface compressive strength. Due to this particular feature, this glass type is especially suitable for the use in touch displays, solar cells cover glass and laminated safety glass. High transformation temperatures and outstanding mechanical properties, e.g. hardness and scratch behavior, are characteristic of this glass type.

See also
Aluminium silicate
Feldspar
Geopolymer cement
Silicate minerals
Calcium aluminosilicate
Sodium aluminosilicate
Gorilla Glass - a type of aluminosilicate glass

References 

 
Glass compositions
Nesosilicates